The 1980 season of the African Cup Winners' Cup football club tournament was won by Tout Puissant Mazembe in two-legged final victory against Africa Sports. This was the sixth season that the tournament took place for the winners of each African country's domestic cup. Twenty-eight sides entered the competition, with Dingareh and Ader Club withdrawing before the 1st leg of the first round. No preliminary round took place during this season of the competition.

First round

|}

Second round

|}

1:2nd leg abandoned, Africa Sports qualified.

Quarterfinals

|}

Semifinals

|}

Final

|}

External links
 Results available on CAF Official Website

African Cup Winners' Cup
2